Kanchan Pande (born 1958) is an Indian Isotope geologist, geochronologist and a professor at the department of earth sciences of the Indian Institute of Technology Mumbai. He is known for his studies on the evolution of continental flood basalts in the Indian subcontinent and is an elected fellow of the National Academy of Sciences, India. The Council of Scientific and Industrial Research, the apex agency of the Government of India for scientific research, awarded him the Shanti Swarup Bhatnagar Prize for Science and Technology, one of the highest Indian science awards for his contributions to Earth, Atmosphere, Ocean and Planetary Sciences in 2003.

Biography 

Kanchan Pande, born on 14 March 1958 in the Indian state of Uttaranchal, completed his master's degree in geology at Kumaun University in 1981 and secured PhD in Geochronology and Isotope geology from Gujarat University in 1990. His career started at Physical Research Laboratory in 1990 as a scientist (Grade D) and he held the position of an associate professor from 1998 to 2002 before becoming a professor in 2003. However, his service as a professor at PRL lasted only 5 months and in June 2003, he moved to the Indian Institute of Technology Mumbai as a professor at the department of earth sciences and holds the post till date.

Pande is known to have done extensive research on the geochronology of the region covering the Deccan Traps. His researches are reported to have assisted in understanding the geochronological constraints for the evolution of continental flood basalts in the Indian subcontinent and highlighted their geological and geochemical impact which has been detailed in an article, Age and duration of the Deccan Traps, India: A review of radiometric and paleomagnetic constraints, published in June 2002. His studies have been documented in several peer-reviewed articles; ResearchGate, an online repository of scientific articles, has listed 70 of them.

Awards and honors 
Pande, who was selected as Young Associate of the Indian Academy of Sciences in 1987, received the Young Scientist Medal of the Indian National Science Academy in 1989. The Council of Scientific and Industrial Research awarded him the Shanti Swarup Bhatnagar Prize, one of the highest Indian science awards in 2003. The National Academy of Sciences, India elected him as a fellow in 2015.

Selected bibliography

See also 
 Large igneous province

Notes

References

External links 
 

Recipients of the Shanti Swarup Bhatnagar Award in Earth, Atmosphere, Ocean & Planetary Sciences
1958 births
Indian scientific authors
Scientists from Uttarakhand
Geochronology
Indian geologists
Gujarat University alumni
Academic staff of IIT Bombay
Fellows of The National Academy of Sciences, India
Living people